The Paris International Agricultural Show (or SIA) is an annual agricultural show and trade fair, that takes place at the end of February or beginning of March at the Paris expo Porte de Versailles in Paris, France. It is one of the world's largest and most important agricultural shows, drawing larger crowds than any other in Paris except the Foire de Paris.

History 
Its name was changed in 1964, but the Concours still exists and is one of the fair's main attractions.

Notes

Effect of COVID-19 Pandemic 
In 2020, the coronavirus pandemic forced the event to close a day earlier than anticipated on 29 February.

The CENECA's president Jean-Luc Poulain announced the cancellation of the 2021 event, initially planned from 27 February to 7 March. Valérie Le Roy, head of the event, is looking into other ways to represent and promote agriculture, a key sector of the French economy.

Structure 
This show is organised on several themed zones (cows, goats, sheep, exotic animals, gastronomy, etc.) in different buildings (there are 8 exhibition halls) at the Paris expo Porte de Versailles.

Themed zones 

In 2015 the stands were grouped into four zones:
 ("Livestock and related sectors"): This zone houses a representative gathering of animals from the 360 exhibited species. At the 2014 show there was a total of more than 3,850 animals in this zone.
 ("Food products"): This sector represents the food culture of 18 different countries from around the world as well as from the different regions of France.
 ("Vegetable crops and related sectors"): Here were exhibited vegetable crops, especially from the cereal sector which is very important in France. This section also informed the public of new trends in gardening as well as providing activities and entertainment for all ages.
 ("Agricultural trade services"): This was run by the French Ministry of Agriculture, Agrifood, and Forestry, which is a major player in the development of agriculture and agricultural training in France.

Since 2010, the show has established thematic guided tours which varied from day to day, depending on whether they were targeted for schoolchildren or trade visitors. In 2013, ten thematic guided tours were offered to visitors, one of which was a special golden jubilee tour.

Related shows 
Entrance is restricted to those working in the agriculture or forestry

It is the largest showcase for cheesemaking knowhow. With 150 exhibitors and 5,997 visitors (of which 20% were from abroad), this is a major trade fair for cheesemongers and buyers of cheese and dairy products.

Organisers 
The show is organised by the CENECA ("National Centre for Agricultural Shows and Trade Fairs"), in partnership with the French Ministry of Agriculture, Agrifood, and Forestry. The French Minister of Agriculture is ultimately responsible for decision-making; its opening and closing dates are fixed by ministerial decree.

CENECA brings together various professional organizations in the agricultural world, agri-food and communities. The city of Paris and the government are the ultimate backers of the show. Although CENECA sets the general strategy, it subcontracts operational matters to Comexposium. Official visits are arranged and managed directly by the CENECA. Jean-Luc Poulain is the current president of the CENECA and of the show.

Comexposium
Comexposium is one of Europe's leading exhibition organizers. It is a joint venture wholly owned subsidiary of the Paris Chamber of Commerce and Industry and Unibail-Rodamco, Comexposium organizes around 114 public and trade events per year, including five of the ten largest French fairs.

Politics and media
The mass media play an important role in publicising the show, with stands taken by Public Sénat, Campagne TV, France 3 and France Ô Visits by the French President, and the leaders of the French political parties, is usually covered. Politicians take the opportunity to reach out to the general public to debate the issues of the day, in an attempt to seem more "down to earth" , and improve their party image.

The media coverage also increases the importance of the show in the public mind, and it is keenly followed by the public. Because of this, it has become an event of international importance. It allows the French government to present the best of its agricultural sector to its European neighbours and its views on maintaining the Common Agricultural Policy, which is very important for subsidising French farmers and for many years has also paid farmers to help protect the rural environment.

See also
 Berlin International Green Week

References

External links 

 www.salon-agriculture.com
 www.cga-paris.com

Agricultural shows
Agriculture in France
Annual events in Paris
1870 establishments in France
Recurring events established in 1870